Disney Junior is a Canadian English-language discretionary specialty channel owned by Corus Entertainment which launched on December 1, 2015. It is a localized version of the U.S. network owned by The Walt Disney Company, broadcasting animated programming aimed at children and preschoolers aged 2 to 7.

History
Prior to September 2015, DHX Media (now WildBrain) operated Disney Junior-branded television services in Canada in the English and French languages as spin-offs of Family Channel since May 6, 2011. In April 2015, Corus acquired Canadian rights to Disney Channel's programming and associated brands. Upon the announcement of the rights deal, Corus stated that it would launch "select Disney branded kids linear television offerings" in the future, after the launch of a Canadian version of Disney Channel.

In August 2015, television provider VMedia stated on its website that Corus would launch Disney Junior and Disney XD channels on December 1, 2015. Upon its launch on September 1, 2015, Disney Channel aired a programming block featuring Disney Junior programs. DHX's Disney Junior services were re-branded as Family Jr. and Télémagino on September 18.

Corus's Disney Junior channel officially launched on December 1, 2015 alongside their Disney XD channel. DHX's rights to broadcast Disney Junior programming expired on January 1, 2016.

On September 1, 2017, the channel obtained a discretionary service licence; it had been operating as an exempt channel before then.

There is no French-language counterpart, however, Disney La Chaîne offers the morning programming block Disney Junior sur La Chaîne Disney to carry network programming in the French language.

On April 21, 2018, the network aired its first film, The Lion King (1994), and has continued to air films since then, such as Cars, Cars 2, and Finding Nemo.

Programming

As of February 2023:

Current

Original programming

Animated series

Reruns of ended series

Original programming

Acquired programming

Upcoming

Original programming

Animated series

Former

Original programming

Animated series

Acquired programming

Notes

References

External links
 

Children's television networks in Canada
Corus Entertainment networks
Television channels and stations established in 2015
Digital cable television networks in Canada
English-language television stations in Canada
2015 establishments in Canada
Canada
Commercial-free television networks